Hưng Thủy is a commune (xã) Lệ Thủy District, Quảng Bình Province, Vietnam. Local economy is mainly agricultural, rice production and cattle breeding.

Communes of Quảng Bình province